Edward Arber (4 December 183623 November 1912) was an English scholar, writer, and editor.

Background and professional work
Arber was born in London. From 1854 he 1878 he worked as a clerk in the Admiralty, and began evening classes at King's College London in 1858. From 1878 to 1881 he studied English literature, under Henry Morley, at University College London; and from 1881 to 1894 he was professor of English at Mason College (which later became Birmingham University). From 1894 he lived in London as emeritus professor, being also a fellow of King's College London. In 1905 he received the honorary degree of D. Litt. from the University of Oxford. He married in 1869, and had two sons, one of whom, E. A. N. Arber, became demonstrator in palaeobotany at the University of Cambridge.

Scholarly edits
As a scholarly editor, Arber made notable contributions to English literature. His name is associated particularly with the series of "English Reprints" (1868–1871), by which an accurate text of the works of many English authors, formerly only accessible in more expensive editions, was placed within reach of the general public. Among the thirty volumes of the series were Stephen Gosson's School of Abuse, Roger Ascham's Toxophilus, Tottel's Miscellany, and Robert Naunton's Fragmenta Regalia. It was followed by the "English Scholar's Library" (16 volumes) which included the Works (1884) of Captain John Smith, governor of Virginia, and the Poems (1882) of Richard Barnfield.

Other publications
In his English Garner (8 vols, 1877–1890) he collected rare old tracts and poems; in 1899–1901 he issued British Anthologies; and in 1907 he began a series called A Christian Library. He was the sole editor of two vast English bibliographies: A Transcript of the Registers of the Stationers' Company, 1553–1640 (1875–1894), and The Term Catalogues, 1668–1709/11.

References

Attribution:

External links

 
 
 
 The Term Catalogues, 1668–1709, With a Number for Easter Term, 1711 A.D. A Contemporary Bibliography of English Literature in the Reigns of Charles II, James II, William and Mary, and Anne. Ed. by Edward Arber, vols. 1–3. London: 1903/ 1905/ 1906. Scan of volume 1, 1668–1682.

1836 births
1912 deaths
People educated at King's College School, London
Alumni of King's College London
Academics of King's College London
Fellows of King's College London
Academics of University College London
Academics of the University of Birmingham
19th-century English writers